The 1669 Act of Annexation was a Parliamentary Act passed by the Parliament of Scotland to establish Orkney and Shetland's status as Crown Dependencies following a legal dispute with William Douglas, 9th Earl of Morton, who held the estates of Orkney and Shetland.  

Titled "Act for Annexation of Orknay and Zetland to the Crown", the legislation was passed on 27 December 1669 (17 December old style) and was the last law passed by the Parliament before its adjournment six days later.   

The Act made Orkney and Shetland exempt from any "dissolution of His Majesty’s lands". In 1742 a further Act of Parliament returned the estates to a later Earl of Morton, however, the original act of Parliament specifically proscribes this, stating that any such change is to be  "considered null, void and of no effect".

The 1669 Act specifically removed Orkney and Shetland from the jurisdiction of the Scottish Parliament and places it firmly in the care of the Crown, restoring the situation as it was 200 years prior at the time of the pawning of the islands by King Christian I of Denmark/Norway to Scotland's James III.

See also 
Orkney under Scottish rule
Shetland pawned to King of Scotland

References

External links 
Scottish Legislation: 1669 Act for annexation of Orkney and Shetland to the Crown - Full text in modern English
1669 Act for annexation of Orkney and Shetland to the Crown - Full text in original English (Shetland & Orkney Udal Law group)

Act For Annexation Of Orkney And Shetland To The Crown, 1669
Act For Annexation Of Orkney And Shetland To The Crown, 1669
Acts of the Parliament of Scotland
Treaties of Scotland
Northern Isles
Act for annexation